DJ-Kicks: Playgroup is a DJ mix album, mixed by Playgroup, also known as Trevor Jackson. It was released on  1 July 2002 on the Studio !K7 independent record label as part of the DJ-Kicks series.

Track listing
 We (featuring Jimi Tenor) - Maurice Fulton Presents Boof
 You're God (I:Cube remix) - Ana Rago
 Ciquri (Discomix) - Material
 Set It Off - Harlequin 4's / Bunker Kru
 Tainted Love - Impedance
 Broken Mirror - Random Factor
 Ma Boom Bey (Love Chant version) - Cultural Vibe
 Caught Up - Metro Area
 The Sky Is Not Crying - Tiny Trendies
 To Our Disco Friends - Smith N Hack
 Tunnel Music - Zongamin
 No Communication, No Love (Devastating) (Salt City Orchestra remix) - Charles Schillings
 March Of General (Chicken Lips Conquest dub) - Nigo
 Buggin' Becky (Tim 'Love' Lee Fully Beard mix) - J-Walk
 Let's Get Jazzy (Dope Dub mix) - KC Flightt
 Do Or Die (dub) - The Human League
 Anti Social Tendencies - The Parallax Corporation
 Behind The Wheel (DJ-Kicks Electroca$h Radio mix) - Playgroup
 Get Up, Get Out - Ralphi Rosario
 Still Hott 4 U - Bobby O
 I Don't Care - Dexter
 Gonna Make You Sweat (Acapella) - Wanda Dee
 House Of Jealous Lovers - The Rapture
 Money B - The Flying Lizards

References 

 DJ-Kicks website

Playgroup
2002 compilation albums